Kim Hannes (born 10 August 1978) is a former Belgian female squash player. Kim Hannes married fellow Belgian star squash player, Stefan Casteleyn in 2014. She achieved her highest career singles ranking of 33 in December 2002.

Career 
Kim Hannes rose to prominence in her squash career after winning the Girl's U17 category of the inaugural edition of the French Junior Open Squash in 1994. After turning out to be a professional squash player in 1995, she also emerged as champion in the Girl's U19 category at the British Junior Open Squash in 1997. Hannes also took part in the second edition of the World University Squash Championships in 1998 and managed to claim a silver medal in the women's singles event.

References 

1978 births
Living people
Belgian female squash players
People from Aarschot
Sportspeople from Flemish Brabant
20th-century Belgian women